WWCW (channel 21) is a television station licensed to Lynchburg, Virginia, United States, serving the Roanoke–Lynchburg market with programming from The CW. It is owned and operated by network majority owner Nexstar Media Group alongside Roanoke-licensed Fox affiliate WFXR (channel 27). Both stations share studios at the Valleypointe office park on Valleypoint Parkway in northeastern Roanoke County; WWCW operates an advertising sales office on Airport Road, along Lynchburg's southwestern border with Campbell County. The station's transmitter is located on Thaxton Mountain in unincorporated central Bedford County. WFXR broadcasts WWCW's CW programming from its transmitter on Poor Mountain in Roanoke County as one of its subchannels and vice versa.

The construction permit for channel 21 in Lynchburg was awarded to communications consultant James E. Price in 1982, but Price sold the station to several different investor groups before Lynchburg–Roanoke Television Partners, led by Thomas F. Carney, built the station. WJPR began broadcasting on March 23, 1986, as an independent station, adding affiliation with Fox in October 1986. The market proved unable to bear both WJPR and Roanoke's WVFT (channel 27), which had gone on the air later that year, due to insufficient advertising revenue and signal issues; in November 1988, WJPR filed for bankruptcy protection. In 1990, Henry A. Ash of Tampa, Florida, acquired both stations out of bankruptcy, receiving a federal waiver to own the combination. On August 20, 1990, they began simulcasting as "Fox 21/27", the Fox affiliate for the market; WJPR had been airing Fox programming since October 1986.

WVFT and WJPR were acquired in 1993 by Grant Communications, and WVFT changed its call sign to WFXR-TV. Under Grant, the stations began airing a local newscast produced by WSLS-TV and also acquired The WB and later The CW affiliation in the market, which was initially aired in overnight hours and then on a local cable channel. With the conversion to digital broadcasting, the Fox and CW services were broadcast as subchannels in both Roanoke and Lynchburg, with channel 21 recognized as the originating station for The CW. Nexstar acquired WFXR and WWCW in 2013 and moved them into new, larger studios two years later, allowing them to begin producing their own news programming.

History

Early years
Channel 21 at Lynchburg picked up no interest until communications consultant James E. Price of Chattanooga, Tennessee, applied for the channel in 1982 under the name Lynchburg Television Associates. The construction permit was awarded in November 1982, took the call sign WJPR, and then was sold to a new investor group led by Price. The permit changed hands two more times before the station was launched, first to Carney Communications of Virginia—owned by Thomas F. Carney of Bal Harbour, Florida—and then to a partnership led by Carney known as Lynchburg–Roanoke Television Partners. One of the partners in the firm was Ralph Renick, a longtime television news anchor in Miami.

Construction began in October 1985 at the Thaxton Mountain tower after approval came from Bedford County officials, and the station announced its existence as the first independent in the market. It stated it would launch by the end of 1985, but that date was missed. So too was a target date of February 10, with winter weather being the culprit.

WJPR debuted on March 23, 1986, giving the market a general-entertainment independent station and being the second of three new station launches that year in western Virginia (the others being Christian station WEFC on channel 38, which started January 3, and Family Group Broadcasting-owned independent WVFT on channel 27 in November 1986). Programming was a typical mix of sitcoms, children's shows, and sports, including Baltimore Orioles baseball. It broadcast from studios and offices in a converted Kroger grocery store in Lynchburg's Forest Hills Shopping Center. To this mix was added the Fox network when it launched that October, as well as local high school football telecasts.

WJPR and WVFT gave the Roanoke–Lynchburg market two independent stations in a short amount of time. Channel 21 had a slow start; some cable systems, notably in Lynchburg itself, balked at carrying the new station, and there were few immediate local advertisers. Neither station was able to find sufficient advertising revenue, and it became clear that the Roanoke-Lynchburg market was not large enough to sustain what were essentially two independent stations. Like most early Fox affiliates, WJPR was still programmed largely as an independent. In November 1988, three months after Paramount Pictures sued the station for a debt of $950,000, Lynchburg–Roanoke Television Partners filed for Chapter 11 bankruptcy reorganization. It was joined in Chapter 11 status by WVFT in April 1989.

Merger with WVFT

Newscasts

WJPR and WFXR began airing a local newscast produced by produced by WSLS-TV in 1996. The newscast continued on the Fox subchannel until October 1, 2015, when news production was taken in-house with the move to the Valleypointe studios.

Technical information

Subchannels
WFXR and WWCW broadcast two shared channels (Fox on 27.1 and 21.2 and The CW on 21.2 and 27.1) and two unique diginets each. Also broadcast on the WWCW multiplex are two subchannels of WZBJ-CD as part of the market's ATSC 3.0 (NextGen TV) hosting arrangement.

Analog-to-digital conversion
WWCW discontinued regular programming on its analog signal, over UHF channel 21, on June 12, 2009, the official date in which full-power television stations in the United States transitioned from analog to digital broadcasts under federal mandate. The station's digital signal remained on its pre-transition UHF channel 20, using virtual channel 21.

Notes

References

External links

Television channels and stations established in 1986
WCW
The CW affiliates
Laff (TV network) affiliates
Grit (TV network) affiliates
Nexstar Media Group
1986 establishments in Virginia